The 2013 Great West Conference men's basketball tournament was held March 14–16, 2013, in Chicago, Illinois at the Emil and Patricia Jones Convocation Center. Per NCAA regulations as a new Division I conference, the Great West champion would not have received an automatic bid into the NCAA tournament until 2020.  The winner, however, did receive an automatic bid to the CollegeInsider.com Tournament.  This was the final GMC men's basketball tournament as the conference dissolved after the season due to its member schools joining other conferences.

Format
With North Dakota joining the Big Sky Conference for the 2012-13 season, the conference used the same 5-team format they used for 2012 as the outline.

Five teams participated in the 2013 Great West tournament. This was the last Great West Conference Men's Basketball Tournament as Houston Baptist left the conference after this season to join the Southland Conference and Utah Valley, UTPA and Chicago State left the conference after this season to join the Western Athletic Conference.

Bracket
* – Denotes overtime period

The entire tournament was streamed online by CSU-TV.

References

Great West Conference men's basketball tournament
-2013 Great West Conference Menand#39;s Basketball Tournament